Events from the year 1545 in Sweden

Incumbents
 Monarch – Gustav I

Events

 Vadstena Castle is built. 
 Olaus Magnus represents Sweden at the Council of Trent.
 The last note in the Diarium Vadstenense.

Births

 Princess Anna Maria of Sweden, (died 1610)  
 Jaakko Ilkka, rebel leader (died 1597)
 Unknown date - Valborg Eriksdotter, royal mistress  (died 1580)

Deaths

References

External links

 
Years of the 16th century in Sweden
Sweden